Matilal Sarkar (born 15 August 1941) is an Indian politician from the Communist Party of India (Marxist). He was Member of the Parliament of India, representing Tripura in the Rajya Sabha. His Rajya Sabha tenure ended on 2 April 2010.

References

Communist Party of India (Marxist) politicians from Tripura
Rajya Sabha members from Tripura
Living people
1941 births
Tripura politicians